The following are a list of events held at the Philippine Arena, the world's largest indoor arena owned by the religious organization Iglesia ni Cristo (INC).

INC Centennial events

The events that took place on the Philippine Arena are a series of activities of the Iglesia ni Cristo (INC) as part of their centennial celebration.

Sporting events

Entertainment events
Notable concerts on the Philippine Arena include South Korean K-pop concerts and AlDub's Tamang Panahon benefit concert.

Other notable events

Upcoming events
 Harry Styles: Love On Tour (March 14, 2023)
 Blackpink: Born Pink World Tour (March 25–26, 2023)
 2023 FIBA Basketball World Cup (August 25–September 10, 2023)

See also
 List of entertainment events at the Araneta Center
 List of entertainment events at the SM Mall of Asia complex

References

Iglesia ni Cristo
Entertainment events in the Philippines
Lists of events by venue